Bostan Rural District is a rural district (dehestan) in Sangan District, Khaf County, Razavi Khorasan province, Iran. As of the 2006 census, its population was 7,316, with there being 1,509 families.  The rural district has 9 villages.

References 

Rural Districts of Razavi Khorasan Province
Khaf County